Akmal bin Azman (born 21 November 2000) is a Singaporean professional footballer who plays as a defender for Geylang International.

Club

Tampines Rovers 
He signed for the Stags in 2019.

Personal life
His twin brother, Akram Azman, is also a footballer playing for Tanjong Pagar United.

His older brother, Naufal Azman, is also a footballer playing for the same club, Geylang International in 2023.

Career statistics

Club

Notes

International statistics

U19 International caps

U16 International caps

References

2000 births
Living people
Singaporean footballers
Association football midfielders
Singapore Premier League players
Albirex Niigata Singapore FC players